Oleg Antonovich Gordievsky, CMG (born 10 October 1938) is a former colonel of the KGB who became KGB resident-designate (rezident) and bureau chief in London, and was a double agent, providing information to the British Secret Intelligence Service (MI6) from 1974 to 1985. After being recalled to Moscow under suspicion, he was exfiltrated from the Soviet Union in July 1985 under a plan code-named Operation Pimlico. The Soviet Union subsequently sentenced him to death in absentia.

Early life and education
The son of an officer of the NKVD (the Soviet secret police and precursor to the KGB), Gordievsky was born in 1938. He proved an excellent student at school, where he learned to speak German.

He studied at a prestigious Moscow University – Moscow State Institute of International Relations – and later undertook NKVD training, where in addition to espionage skills he mastered German and also learned to speak Danish, Swedish, and Norwegian.

Career
On completion of his studies, Gordievsky joined the foreign service and was posted to East Berlin in August 1961, just before the erection of the Berlin Wall. The building of the wall appalled him, and he became disillusioned with the Soviet system. After spending a year in Berlin, he returned to Moscow. 

Gordievsky joined the KGB in 1963, and was posted to the Soviet embassy in Copenhagen in 1966. He became outraged by the USSR's cruel crushing of the Prague Spring reform movement in Czechoslovakia in August 1968, and began sending covert signals to Danish and British intelligence agents and agencies that he might be willing to cooperate with them. In 1974 he agreed to pass secrets to MI6, a step he viewed as "nothing less than undermining the Soviet system". MI6 gave him the codename SUNBEAM. His second posting to Denmark ended in 1978, and he was recalled to Moscow – this time for a lengthy period because he quickly divorced his wife and married a woman he had been having an affair with, and the KGB frowned upon affairs and divorces as immoral. During this Moscow period, it was too risky for him to send any information to MI6.

After he learned to speak English and lobbied heavily for a position that opened up in London, the KGB posted Gordievsky to London in June 1982. He steadily advanced in rank there with the help of secret aid and manipulation by MI6, which handed him abundant non-damaging information and contacts; MI6 also steadily banished his direct superiors back to Moscow on trumped-up charges so that Gordievsky took their place. He continued to provide secret documents and information to MI6. While in London, his MI6 code name was NOCTON. The CIA – told of MI6's high-level informant but not his name or position – gave him the codename TICKLE.

In late April 1985 he was promoted to KGB station chief (resident-designate or rezident) in London at the Soviet embassy.  He was suddenly summoned back to Moscow via a telegram on 16 May 1985. MI6 allowed him to make his own decision whether to immediately defect to the UK and live thenceforth in secrecy under their protection, or to go to Moscow with the understanding that he could be interrogated, tortured, or killed if the KGB suspected his betrayal. Gordievsky felt, given the huge benefits MI6 would reap if he remained rezident of the embassy, that he was being encouraged by MI6 to return to Moscow as ordered, and decided on that; MI6 began to revive a plan to extricate him if necessary. 

Unbeknownst to him, Gordievsky had been betrayed in early May (or early June 1985 at the latest) by CIA officer Aldrich Ames. After returning to Moscow on 19 May 1985, Gordievsky was drugged and interrogated, but not yet criminally charged; instead he was placed in a non-existent desk job in a nonoperational department of the KGB. Under increasing surveillance and pressure in Moscow and seriously suspected of being a double agent, in July 1985 he managed to send a pre-arranged covert signal to MI6 to be rescued. 

Following his exfiltration from the USSR to the UK in 1985, he became of even greater use to the West, in that the information he disclosed (and had previously disclosed) could be immediately acted upon and shared without endangering his life, identity, or position.

British secret agent
During his first Danish posting, Gordievsky became disenchanted with his work in the KGB, particularly after the Soviet invasion of Czechoslovakia in 1968. He tried to send a covert sympathetic message to the Politiets Efterretningstjeneste (Danish Security Intelligence Service), called PET, but his three-year stint ended and he returned to Moscow before making any direct contact. By the time he arrived again in Copenhagen in October 1972 for a second three-year stint, both the PET as well as MI6 – which had been tipped off by one of Gordievsky's old university friends – felt he was a persuadable agent. MI6 subsequently made contact with Gordievsky, and began running him as a double agent in 1974.

The value of MI6's recruitment of such a highly placed and valuable intelligence asset increased dramatically when, in 1982, the KGB posted Gordievsky to London, and he rose through the ranks there, gaining the ability to access higher and higher levels of Soviet secrets, which he passed easily to MI6 via a London safe house.

Two of Gordievsky's most important contributions were averting a potential nuclear confrontation with the Soviet Union, when NATO exercise Able Archer 83 was misinterpreted by the Soviets as a potential first strike, and identifying Mikhail Gorbachev as the Soviet heir-apparent long before he came to prominence. Indeed, the information passed by Gordievsky became the first proof of how worried the Soviet leadership had become about the possibility of a NATO nuclear first strike.

Sudden recall to Moscow
Gordievsky was suddenly ordered back to Moscow in mid May 1985, a few weeks after he had been promoted to KGB station chief in London. Although MI6 allowed him the option to instead defect and stay in London under their protection, on 19 May 1985 he left for Moscow. After his arrival, he was taken to a KGB safe house outside Moscow, drugged, and interrogated. He was questioned for about five hours. After that, he was released and told that he would never work abroad again. He was suspected of espionage for a foreign power, but his superiors stalled on taking any overt further action against him. In June 1985, he was joined in Moscow by his wife and two children, who had been living with him in London.

Although MI6 had passed on information provided by Gordievsky to the American CIA, the British would not reveal their source, so the CIA had conducted a covert operation to discover who the source was. After about a year, they realised that it must be Gordievsky. There was great suspicion that a high-ranking American CIA officer, Aldrich Ames, who had been selling secrets to the KGB, reported Gordievsky's treachery to Soviet counterintelligence. Ames first met and sold classified information to a KGB agent on 15 May 1985, in Washington, DC; the following day Gordievsky received the telegram from KGB leadership recalling him to Moscow. A 1994 report by the Washington Post, however, stated that "After six weeks of questioning Ames ... the FBI and CIA remain baffled about whether Ames or someone else first warned the Soviets about Gordievsky". An FBI report later stated that Ames had not advised the Soviets about Gordievsky until 13 June 1985; by that time, Gordievsky was under KGB surveillance but he had not yet been charged with treason as of 19 July 1985 when MI6 agents began the process of his escape. Nevertheless, biographer Ben Macintyre and most people involved in the Gordievsky case believe that during his first visit with the KGB in Washington in early May 1985, Ames provided sufficient information to prompt an investigation by Colonel Viktor Budanov, the KGB's top investigator, and trigger Gordievsky's recall.

Escape from the USSR
An elaborate escape plan from the USSR had been already devised for Gordievsky by MI6 in 1978, when the KGB called him back to Moscow for a few years after his second three-year stint in Copenhagen. The escape plan was code-named "Operation Pimlico", and was devised by an MI6 officer named Valerie Pettit.

Although he almost certainly remained under KGB surveillance, Gordievsky managed to send a covert signal to MI6, which activated the elaborate escape plan, Pimlico, that had been in place for many years for just such an emergency. He waited on a particular street corner, on a particular weekday at 7.30 pm, carrying a Safeway bag as a signal. An MI6 agent walked past carrying a Harrods bag, eating a Mars bar, and the two made eye contact. These mutual signals indicated that the escape plan was to be activated immediately.

On 19 July 1985, Gordievsky went for his usual jog, but he instead managed to evade his KGB tails and boarded a train to Vyborg, near the Finnish border, where he was met by British embassy cars, after they managed to lose the three KGB surveillance cars following them. Lying down in the boot of a Ford Sierra saloon, he was smuggled across the border into Finland. Two British diplomats and their wives were Gordievsky's courier; to dissuade sniffer dogs at the Finnish border one of the wives dropped her baby's dirty nappy (US:diaper) on the ground, causing the dogs to flee. Gordievsky was flown to the UK via Norway; in the UK, his MI6 codename was changed to OVATION.

Soviet authorities subsequently sentenced Gordievsky to death in absentia for treason, a sentence never rescinded by post-Soviet Russian authorities, but which cannot be legally carried out because of Russia's then-membership in the Council of Europe. His wife, Leila (an Azeri) was the daughter of a KGB officer and was unaware of her husband's defection. She and their children were on holiday in the Azerbaijan SSR at the time of his escape. She was interrogated and detained for some six years, the Soviets presuming (wrongly) that she had been complicit in Gordievsky's activities. However, the marriage was effectively dead by then and eventually it foundered completely. It was reported in 2013 that Gordievsky was in a long-term relationship with a British woman he had met in the 1990s.

Gordievsky's exfiltration greatly embarrassed both the KGB and the Soviet Union and resulted in disruptions by Viktor Babunov, the KGB's chief of counterintelligence, within the KGB including Sergei Ivanov's career with the KGB, who was KGB resident in Finland, as well as numerous members of the Leningrad KGB, which was responsible for surveillance of British subjects, and numerous persons close to Vladimir Putin, who was a member of the Leningrad KGB.

Gordievsky included a discussion of his exfiltration in his memoir, Next Stop Execution, published in 1995.

Life in the UK

Gordievsky has written a number of books on the subject of the KGB and is a frequently quoted media pundit on the subject.

In 1990, he was consultant editor of the journal Intelligence and National Security, and he worked on television in the UK in the 1990s, including the game show Wanted. In 1995, the former British Labour Party leader Michael Foot received an out-of-court settlement (said to be "substantial") from The Sunday Times after the newspaper alleged, in articles derived from claims in the original manuscript of Gordievsky's book Next Stop Execution (1995), that Foot was a KGB "agent of influence" with the codename 'Boot'.

On 26 February 2005, he was awarded an Honorary Degree of Doctor of Letters by the University of Buckingham in recognition of his outstanding service to the security and the safety of the United Kingdom.

Gordievsky was appointed Companion of the Most Distinguished Order of St Michael and St George (CMG) for "services to the security of the United Kingdom" in the 2007 Queen's Birthday Honours (in the Diplomatic List). The Guardian newspaper noted that it was "the same gong given (to) his fictional cold war colleague James Bond."

Gordievsky said that the KGB were puzzled by and denied the claim that Director General of MI5 Roger Hollis was a Soviet agent. In the 2009 ITV programme Inside MI5: The Real Spooks, he recounted how he saw the head of the British section of the KGB express surprise at the allegations that he read in a British newspaper about Roger Hollis being a KGB agent: "Why is it they are speaking about Roger Hollis, such nonsense, can't understand it, it must be some special British trick directed against us". The allegiance of Hollis remains a debated historical issue; the MI5 official website has cited Gordievsky's revelation as a vindication of Hollis.

In the Daily Telegraph in 2010, Charles Moore gave a "full account", which he said had been provided to him by Gordievsky shortly after Foot's death, of the extent of Foot's alleged KGB involvement. Moore also wrote that, although the claims are difficult to corroborate without MI6 and KGB files, Gordievsky's past record in revealing KGB contacts in Britain had been shown to be reliable.

Gordievsky was featured in the PBS documentary Commanding Heights: The Battle for the World Economy.

Work in recent years included being a consultant editor for the journal of National Security, co-hosting a TV show titled Wanted in the Nineties and writing content for Literary Review.

Gordievsky lived for years in a "safe house" in London, and security has been tightened since the Salisbury poisonings. A September 2018 article indicated that by that time he was living in an undisclosed location in the Home counties of England.

Suspected poisoning
In April 2008, the media reported that on 2 November 2007, Gordievsky had been taken by ambulance from his home in Surrey to a local hospital, where he spent 34 hours unconscious. He claimed that he was poisoned with thallium by "rogue elements in Moscow". He accused MI6 of forcing Special Branch to drop its early investigations into his allegations; according to him, the investigation was only reopened due to the intervention of former MI5 Director General Eliza Manningham-Buller.

In Gordievsky's opinion, the culprit was a UK-based Russian business associate who had supplied him with pills, which he said were the sedative Xanax, purportedly for insomnia; he refused to identify the associate, saying British authorities had advised against it. Gordievsky accused MI6 of trying to suppress the incident from being known. "I realised they wanted to hush up the crime," he remarked. "There has been accusation and counter-accusation. If they are saying I am not affected by the poison, why did I spend two weeks in hospital?"

In popular media
In 2018 Ben Macintyre published a biography of Gordievsky, The Spy and the Traitor: The Greatest Espionage Story of the Cold War. The 2019 edition of the book includes an Afterword of post-publication reactions from officers of MI6, the KGB, and the CIA who had been involved in the events surrounding Gordievsky.

In March 2020, Gordievsky's story was recounted in an episode of Spy Wars With Damian Lewis, on the Smithsonian Channel in the US, streaming on various cable services. The episode, The Man Who Saved The World, recounts the "years-long effort by Gordievsky to pass Soviet intelligence to the British, all but preventing a nuclear Armageddon between the Soviet Union and the West".

Works

 Jakob Andersen med Oleg Gordievsky: "De Røde Spioner – KGB's operationer i Danmark fra Stalin til Jeltsin, fra Stauning til Nyrup", Høst & Søn, Copenhagen (2002).

See also
 List of Eastern Bloc defectors
 List of KGB defectors
 Vitaly Nuykin

References

External links

 Time Out magazine: Oleg Gordievsky: Interview (2006)
 Biographer Ben Macintyre summarizes Gordievsky's life, career, and escape from the USSR (one-hour talk, 2018)

1938 births
Living people
British spies against the Soviet Union
Companions of the Order of St Michael and St George
Double agents
Eastern Bloc spies for the West
KGB officers
Soviet diplomats
Soviet spies
Soviet intelligence personnel who defected to the United Kingdom
Moscow State Institute of International Relations alumni
Secret Intelligence Service
People sentenced to death in absentia by the Soviet Union